In mathematics, a directed set (or a directed preorder or a filtered set) is a nonempty set  together with a reflexive and transitive binary relation  (that is, a preorder), with the additional property that every pair of elements has an upper bound.

A  is defined analogously, meaning that every pair of elements is bounded below. 
Some authors (and this article) assume that a directed set is directed upward, unless otherwise stated. Other authors call a set directed if and only if it is directed both upward and downward.

Directed sets are a generalization of nonempty totally ordered sets. That is, all totally ordered sets are directed sets (contrast  ordered sets, which need not be directed). Join-semilattices (which are partially ordered sets) are directed sets as well, but not conversely. Likewise, lattices are directed sets both upward and downward.

In topology, directed sets are used to define nets, which generalize sequences and unite the various notions of limit used in analysis. Directed sets also give rise to direct limits in abstract algebra and (more generally) category theory.

Equivalent definition

In addition to the definition above, there is an equivalent definition. A directed set is a set  with a preorder such that every finite subset of  has an upper bound. In this definition, the existence of an upper bound of the empty subset implies that  is nonempty.

Examples

The set of natural numbers  with the ordinary order  is one of the most important examples of a directed set (and so is every totally ordered set).

If  is a real number then the set  can be turned into a directed set by defining  if  (so "greater" elements are closer to ). We then say that the reals have been directed towards  This is an example of a directed set that is  partially ordered nor totally ordered.

Maximal and greatest elements

An element  of a preordered set  is a maximal element if for every   implies 
It is a greatest element if for every  

Any preordered set with a greatest element is a directed set with the same preorder. 

Every maximal element of a directed preordered set is a greatest element.  Indeed, a directed preordered set is characterized by equality of the (possibly empty) sets of maximal and of greatest elements.

Product of directed sets

Let  and  be directed sets. Then the Cartesian product set  can be made into a directed set by defining  if and only if  and  In analogy to the product order this is the product direction on the Cartesian product.  For example, the set  of pairs of natural numbers can be made into a directed set by defining  if and only if  and

Subset inclusion

The subset inclusion relation  along with its dual  define partial orders on any given family of sets. 
A non-empty family of sets is a directed set with respect to the partial order  (respectively) if and only if the intersection (respectively, union) of any two of its members contains as a subset (respectively, is contained as a subset of) some third member. 
or equivalently, 
for all  there exists some  such that  (respectively).

Many important examples of directed sets can be defined using these partial orders. 
Every -system, which is a non-empty family of sets that is closed under the intersection of any two of its members, is a directed set with respect to  Every λ-system is a directed set with respect to  Every filter, topology, and σ-algebra is a directed set with respect to both  and  

  since  contains itself.
 because  and since both  and  we have  and 

Contrast with semilattices

Directed set is a more general concept than (join) semilattice: every join semilattice is a directed set, as the join or least upper bound of two elements is the desired   The converse does not hold however, witness the directed set {1000,0001,1101,1011,1111} ordered bitwise (e.g.  holds, but  does not, since in the last bit 1 > 0), where {1000,0001} has three upper bounds but no  upper bound, cf. picture. (Also note that without 1111, the set is not directed.)

Directed subsets
The order relation in a directed set is not required to be antisymmetric, and therefore directed sets are not always partial orders. However, the term  is also used frequently in the context of posets. In this setting, a subset  of a partially ordered set  is called a directed subset if it is a directed set according to the same partial order: in other words, it is not the empty set, and every pair of elements has an upper bound.

A directed subset of a poset is not required to be downward closed; a subset of a poset is directed if and only if its downward closure is an ideal. While the definition of a directed set is for an "upward-directed" set (every pair of elements has an upper bound), it is also possible to define a downward-directed set in which every pair of elements has a common lower bound. A subset of a poset is downward-directed if and only if its upper closure is a filter.

Directed subsets are used in domain theory, which studies directed-complete partial orders. These are posets in which every upward-directed set is required to have a least upper bound. In this context, directed subsets again provide a generalization of convergent sequences.

See also

Notes

References

 J. L. Kelley (1955), General Topology.
 Gierz, Hofmann, Keimel, et al. (2003), Continuous Lattices and Domains, Cambridge University Press. .

Binary relations
General topology
Order theory